Scoparia may refer to:
Scoparia (moth), a genus of moths
Scoparia (plant), a genus of plants

See also
Scoparius (disambiguation)